Clarence "J. C." Van Landingham (c. 1918–1996) was an American stock car racing driver. A Florida native, he competed in the NASCAR Grand National Series, in 1950, later owning a car in the series.

Life and career
Born in Greensboro, Florida, Van Landingham relocated to DeLand, Florida in 1921; a World War II veteran of the United States Navy, he was the owner of Inland Buick and Inland Plymouth Dodge-Chrysler in DeLand. In 1950 Van Landingham competed in a race at the Daytona Beach and Road Course; he started second and finished fifth in the event, driving a Buick. He later entered a car driven by Dick Joslin in the event in 1955.

In the late 1960s Van Landingham served as the president of the DeLand Chamber of Commerce. He died on March 5, 1996.

Motorsports career results

NASCAR 
(key) (Bold – Pole position awarded by qualifying time. Italics – Pole position earned by points standings or practice time. * – Most laps led.)

Grand National Series

References

External links

Racing drivers from Florida
NASCAR drivers
NASCAR team owners
1910s births
1996 deaths
Year of birth uncertain
People from DeLand, Florida